Edward "Teddy" Campbell Sutherland (born 28 March 2000) is an English professional footballer who plays as a winger for Spanish club Cartagena.

Professional career
Sutherland was born in London, England and moved to Spain with his family to Cartagena, Spain at the age of four. He soon after joined the youth academy of FC Cartagena, and at 11 had a stint with Villarreal CF.

Sutherland returned to Cartagena in 2016, being assigned to affiliate club EF Ciudad Jardín. He made his senior – and first team – debut on 14 May 2017, coming on as a late substitute for Germán Sáenz in a 0–0 Segunda División B home draw against Recreativo de Huelva.

Sutherland was assigned to the reserves in Tercera División for the 2017–18 season, and featured regularly for the side before agreeing to a three-year contract with Getafe CF in July 2018; at the latter side, he appeared exclusively for the Juvenil squad. On 16 July 2019, he moved to another reserve team, Elche CF Ilicitano also in the fourth tier.

Sutherland returned to Cartagena on 18 September 2020, being initially assigned to the B-team. He made his professional debut with the Efesé the following 22 March, replacing Elady Zorrilla late into a 0–2 away loss to Albacete Balompié.

On 2 September 2021, Sutherland moved to Atlético Madrid on loan for one year, and was assigned to the B-team in Tercera División RFEF.

References

External links
 
 
 

2000 births
Living people
Footballers from Greater London
English footballers
Association football wingers
Segunda División players
Segunda División B players
Tercera División players
Tercera Federación players
FC Cartagena footballers
FC Cartagena B players
Atlético Madrid B players
Elche CF Ilicitano footballers
English emigrants to Spain
Spanish footballers
Footballers from the Region of Murcia
Sportspeople from Cartagena, Spain